Hotot may refer to:

 Hotot (program), a micro-blogging desktop client for Twitter
 Hotot-en-Auge, a commune in the Calvados department in the Normandy region in northwestern France
 Walter Hotot, English politician
 Agnes Hotot, English noblewoman
 Dwarf Hotot, a breed of domestic rabbit 
 Blanc de Hotot, a breed of domestic rabbit